Weststellingwerf (Stellingwarfs:  or ) is a municipality in the province of Friesland in the northern Netherlands.
It is one of the municipalities of Friesland, where the spoken language is not West Frisian; instead, Stellingwerfs, a dialect of Dutch Low Saxon, is spoken here.

Population centres 

A small part of the village Willemsoord lays within Weststellingwerf and Noordwolde-Zuid is also mainly named as a village, but stated by municipality as a hamlet.

The other hamlets are: Boekelte, Gracht, Munnekezeel, Overburen, Rijsberkampen, Rode Dorp, Schoterzijl (partially) and Zuid (partially)

Topography

Dutch Topographic map of the municipality of Weststellingwerf, 2013.

Wolvega

Wolvega is the capital city of Weststellingwerf.

Transportation 
Railway Station: Wolvega

Notable people 

 Peter Stuyvesant (1592–1672) last governor of New Amsterdam
 Johan Eilerts de Haan (1865-1910) Dutch explorer and soldier
 Johan van Minnen (1932–2016) journalist and politician. 
 Johan Veenstra (born 1946) an author, poet and columnist
 Sijtje van der Lende (born 1950) former speed skater, competed at the 1976 and 1980 Winter Olympics
 Gerard van Klaveren (born 1951) politician, Mayor of Weststellingwerf 2005-2017
 Monique Knol (born 1964) former racing cyclist, won gold and bronze medals in two consecutive Summer Olympics

Gallery

References

External links 

Official website
News and events,Weststellingwerf (Dutch website)

 
Municipalities of Friesland